Provident City is a ghost town in the far southern panhandle of Colorado County in the U.S. state of Texas. The former settlement is located along County Road 190. The town was first settled through a land promotion scheme in 1909 and enjoyed a brief heyday. When the hoped-for railroad obviously would never come to town, people began moving away. The post office closed in 1953, and most of the land was bought up for ranching. The town no longer exists, though the original hotel survives in private hands. Reaching the site requires driving  on a gravel road from the nearest highway.

Geography
After County Road 17 crosses into Colorado County, it becomes County Road 190 and intersects with County Road 248 within a short distance.

History
In 1909, the Provident Land Company of Kansas City began heavily promoting land between Goldenrod Creek and Sandy Creek in Colorado County. As many as 500 families from the American Midwest bought 5- to ten-acre plots, sight unseen. The company built hotels in Ganado and in Provident City to accommodate people interested in buying land in the area. By 1910, the town boasted banks, a broom factory, a cannery, churches, a drugstore, general and grocery stores, a jewelry store, restaurants, a school, and an undertaker. That year, a post office opened. The sandy local soil proved to be ideal for growing melons, cucumbers, and other vegetables. The town counted 150 residents in 1914. By that year, a promised railroad connection clearly would not materialize in the isolated place. During World War I, people began to move to urban centers in search of higher wages. During the Great Depression, many area farms were abandoned and lost through nonpayment of taxes. By 1949, the population had sunk to 30 persons and the post office closed in 1953. Hancock Oil bought most of the property and converted it to ranching operations. By 1986, only the old hotel remained. One source lists Provident City among Texas ghost towns.

See also
 Danish Heritage Preservation Society

References

Populated places in Colorado County, Texas
Ghost towns in South Texas